The Dutch Ladies Open is a women's professional golf tournament on the Ladies European Tour that is played in the Netherlands. It was first played in 1986, and annually from 2004 to 2015. It resumed play in 2021.

Winners

References

External links
Ladies European Tour

Ladies European Tour events
Golf tournaments in the Netherlands
Recurring sporting events established in 1986